The 194 Medium Regiment is part of the Regiment of Artillery of the Indian Army.

Formation and history
The regiment was raised as 194 Mountain Regiment on 21 January 1966 at Babina. The first commanding officer was Lieutenant Colonel Keith Shortlands. The regiment has subsequently been converted to a field regiment and is presently a medium regiment.

Operations
The regiment has taken part in the following operations –
Indo-Pakistani War of 1971

The regiment was part of 4 Mountain Artillery Brigade of 4 Mountain Division. The division was part of 2 Corps and saw operations in the South Western sector in the Bangladesh Liberation War. It fought at Jibannagar, Uthali, Darshana, Jhenaidah, Kushtia and Hardinge Bridge. The regiment also witnessed the surrender of PakistanI forces after the war. The regiment was awarded two Vir Chakras and two mentioned in dispatches. The names of the fallen soldiers of the regiment forms part of the War Memorial in Ambala Cantonment, the present location of 2 Corps.
Other operations
Operation Rakshak – The regiment had three tenures of counter insurgency operations, 1995-1996 (Srinagar), 1999-2004 (Poonch) and 2008–2011.
Operation Vijay - 1999
Operation Parakram – 2001-2002 – It was actively involved in artillery firing against enemy forces.

Gallantry awards
The regiment has won the following gallantry awards –
Vir Chakra – 2 (Major Manjit Singh Duggal, Captain Naik Balkrishna Ramachandra)
Ati Vishisht Seva Medal – 1 
Sena Medal – 1 
Vishisht Seva Medal – 2 
Mentioned in dispatches – 2 (Major Desmond Richard Braganza, Gunner (ORA) Prakash Singh)
Chief of Army Staff Commendation cards – 5
General Officer Commanding in Chief Commendation cards – 18
United Nations Mission Force Commander Commendation card – 1

Notable Officers
Lieutenant General Ajay Kumar Suri – the Director General, Army Aviation Corps was commissioned into the unit in 	1985.

Other achievements
The regiment has regularly excelled in sporting activities. The achievers include - 
Gunner Vakil Raj Dhendor won a team bronze in archery at the 6th World Military Games at Mungyeong, South Korea in 2015. He also won a team bronze for archery (recurve men) in the 35th National Archery Competition. 
Havildar Sawan Kumar represented the services team in team kata at the National Karate Championship at New Delhi in February 2015.

See also
List of artillery regiments of Indian Army

References

Military units and formations established in 1966
Artillery regiments of the Indian Army after 1947